Robyn Kimberly Moodaly (born 16 June 1994) is a South African soccer player who plays as a midfielder for the South Africa women's national team. She attended the 2012 and 2016 Summer Olympics.

Early life
Robyn Moodaly was born in East London, Eastern Cape, South Africa. She began to play football, as she was growing up, describing it as "being in my genes". Moodaly played mostly with boy's teams, since there were no girls teams nearby and eventually moved to Johannesburg to continue to play the game.

In 2013, Moodaly joined AIB College of Business in Des Moines, Iowa. She trained with the college soccer team but was unable to play in any fixtures in 2013 due to red tape. Moodaly played two games for W-League team Colorado Rush Women in 2013.

International career
While attending the University of Pretoria's High Performance Centre, Moodaly came to the attention of South Africa women's national football team selectors who drafted her into the national Under–17 squad. Moodaly was then part of the South African selection at the 2010 FIFA U-17 Women's World Cup. She made her debut for the senior national team aged 16 in January 2011. She only appeared for the under-21 team after she had already played for the senior side, switching back and forth between the two sides on several occasions. She attributed this to a lack of female players available. She was selected for the South African squad at the 2012 Summer Olympics in London, United Kingdom.

During the following years, she was hampered by injuries, and fought to be fit in time for the 2016 Summer Olympics in Rio de Janeiro, Brazil. She was selected for the warm-up match immediately prior to the tournament, against world champions the United States. She was subsequently selected for the squad.

References

External links
 

Living people
1994 births
Women's association football midfielders
South Africa women's international soccer players
South African women's soccer players
South African expatriate soccer players
Footballers at the 2012 Summer Olympics
Footballers at the 2016 Summer Olympics
Olympic soccer players of South Africa
Expatriate women's soccer players in the United States
Sportspeople from East London, Eastern Cape
USL W-League (1995–2015) players
AIB College of Business alumni
University of Northwestern Ohio alumni
College women's soccer players in the United States
Soccer players from the Eastern Cape